WXWX (96.3 FM) is a radio station licensed to the town of Marietta, Mississippi and owned by Flinn Broadcasting. It features a Top 40 (CHR) format known as Wild 96.3.  The previous programming was a simulcast arrangement with country-formatted WADI, but the two stations have different owners and have coverage areas which overlap.

History
WXWX began broadcasting in 2008, and aired a sports format, as an affiliate of ESPN Radio. In summer 2016, the station dropped its sports format. It later adopted an alternative rock format, simulcasting "I96" WIVG in Tunica, Mississippi.

As of November 25, 2022, the station flipped to Top 40/CHR as "Wild 96.3".

Previous logo

References

External links

XWX
Country radio stations in the United States
Radio stations established in 2008
2008 establishments in Mississippi